Dunfermline Football Club was an association football club from Dunfermline in Scotland.  The club entered the Scottish Cup every season from 1876–77 to 1889–90.  However the club only won 3 ties, plus one after which it was disqualified; on 7 occasions the club scratched before playing a match.

History

The club was formed in 1874 as a way for members of the Dunfermline Cricket Club to keep fit over the winter, after cricket club member David Brown saw a Queen's Park F.C. match in Glasgow and bought a football to take home.

As one of the first clubs in the east of Scotland, the club in its early days found it difficult to find opponents, but before the 1876–77 season it was admitted to the Edinburgh Football Association, entitling it to take part in the Edinburgh FA Cup; this was welcome to the local sides as the Heart of Midlothian had just "broken up".  The club's first entry to the Scottish Cup saw it placed in the Edinburgh geographical grouping in the first round and gain a walkover, as the temporarily-defunct Hearts had already entered and the clubs were drawn together.  Dunfermline lost at Hamilton F.C. in the second round.  The club did not win a tie until 1879–80, when it beat Edinburgh Thistle.

The club had a little more success in the Edinburgh Cup, a competition it entered until 1883–84.  Its best run came in 1879–80, when three wins took Dunfermline into the final, against Hibernian F.C. at Powderhall on 6 March in front of a crowd of over 2,000.  Dunfermline had a strong wind behind the side in the first half, but the scores were level at 3–3 at half-time; in the second half the local side scored 3 unanswered goals.  Perhaps because of the weather, the match was "declared undecided", and a re-play held at the same venue a fortnight later.  This time Hibernian dominated from start to finish and won 5–0.  Notably the crowd had almost doubled for the second match.

In 1884–85, the club reached the third round for the only time.  In the first round, Dunfermline gained its biggest Cup win, 10–2 over Newcastleton F.C., in front of a crowd of 2,000.  In the second round, the club was drawn at home to Heart of Midlothian F.C., and took a surprise lead from the kick-off.  Hearts replied with 11 unanswered goals.  However Dunfermline protested that two of the Hearts players (Chris M'Nee and James Maxwell) were professionals and, "after careful consideration", the protest was upheld; the players were receiving 26 shillings per week.  In the third round, the club lost 7–1 at Wishaw Swifts, having been outclassed all match and scoring a consolation via the one chance the club had.

The club had more success on a local level.  It was a founder member of the Fifeshire Football Association in 1882 and in David Brown provided the first President.  It also won the first Fifeshire Cup in 1882–83, beating Cowdenbeath 4–1 in the final after two ties against minor clubs.  The club repeated the feat in 1883–84, beating Alloa Athletic in the final, and were runners-up to Cowdenbeath in 1884–85.

In April 1885, over a dispute as to whether the club should allow non-cricketers to play for the football side, the best football players, including Bob Sandilands and Jim Toddie, broke away to form Dunfermline Athletic.  The split worked in favour of the new club; the only competitive match between the two, in the Fifeshire Cup in 1886, ended 6–0 to the Athletic.  

Although Dunfermline continued to enter the Scottish Cup until 1889–90, it only played one more tie, scratching on four occasions (twice to the Athletic) and being disqualified after beating Lassodie in 1887–88, on the basis that the secretary had sent in the list of registered players after the deadline.  Dunfermline also never won another Fifeshire Cup tie and stopped entering after 1890–91.

With Dunfermline Athletic having taken over as the top club, Dunfermline abandoned senior football from the 1891–92 season.  The club essentially merged with South-side Athletic, which moved to Ladysmill and changed its name to Dunfermline Juniors, which reached the final of the Scottish Junior Cup in 1896–97, and wound up at the end of the 1900–01 season.

Colours

The club played in blue and white hoops, with navy shorts.

Ground

The club originally played on the Town Green.  By 1882 the club was playing at Ladysmill.

Honours

Fifeshire Cup:
Winners: 1882–83, 1883–84
Runners–up: 1884–85

Edinburgh Cup:
Runners-up: 1879–80

External links

Scottish Cup results
Fifeshire Cup results

References

 
Defunct football clubs in Scotland
Association football clubs established in 1874
1874 establishments in Scotland
Football clubs in Fife
Association football clubs disestablished in 1891
1891 disestablishments in Scotland